Yi bua (also spelt yi buak, yi buah, or yibua) is a traditional Hainanese kuih. It is a Hainanese steamed dumpling made of glutinous rice flour dough. Also known as kuih e-oua, it is filled with a palm sugar sweetened mixture of grated coconut, toasted sesame seeds and crushed roasted peanuts, wrapped with sheets of banana leaves pressed into a fluted cup shape, and customarily marked with a dab of red food colouring. This kuih is traditionally served during a wedding and a baby's full-moon celebration.

See also

Kue
Kuih
 List of steamed foods
Mochi

References

Kue
Chinese confectionery
Hainanese cuisine
Singaporean cuisine
Steamed foods